"Down for the One" is the second single released by English singer and songwriter Beverley Knight. The track peaked at #55 on the UK Singles Chart when it was released in August 1995, and received support from urban radio.

The music video for the song features Knight performing in a club with two backing dancers. The video also features a cameo from Richard Blackwood. It was unknown to fans that a video existed for the song until the video's release on iTunes on 22 June 2009.

Critical reception
Music & Media wrote, "Vocalist Knight effortlessly wins the battle against a pounding beat. What happened to the drummer–either human or electric–after cutting this fine slice of swingbeat is unclear."

Track list
CD
"Down for the One" 3:49
"Down for the One" (long version) 5:13
"Down for the One" (2B3 Retro mix) 5:12
"So Happy" 4:35

Charts

Personnel
Written by Beverley Knight, Neville Thomas and Pule Pheto
Produced by Neville Thomas and Pule Pheto
All vocals performed by Beverley Knight

References

See also
Beverley Knight discography

1995 singles
Beverley Knight songs
Songs written by Beverley Knight
Songs written by Pule Pheto
Songs written by Neville Thomas
Hip hop soul songs
1994 songs